Roger Whelpdale (died 1423) was an English priest and Bishop of Carlisle from 1419 until 1423. He was selected as bishop on 22 December 1419, and consecrated after March 1420. He was also Provost of The Queen's College, Oxford, from 1404 to 1421.

Whelpdale died on 4 February 1423.

Citations

References

 

1423 deaths
Bishops of Carlisle
15th-century English Roman Catholic bishops
Year of birth unknown
Provosts of The Queen's College, Oxford